Jalacatal Futbol Clube  is a Salvadoran professional football club based in Canton Jalacatal, San miguel, El Salvador.

The club currently plays in the Tercera Division de Fútbol Salvadoreño.

The club was founded in 2007.

Honours
La Asociación Departamental de Fútbol Aficionado' and predecessors (4th tier)
Champions (1): 2016

Current squad
As of:

Captain
 TBD (2016)

Players

List of Coaches
  Jose Ramon Contreras (March 2017 – June 2017)
  Esteban Melara (June 2017–)

References

External links
 [ ] 

Jalacatal